Saint Francis School may refer to:

In India
Saint Francis School Deoghar
St. Francis School, Harmu

In the United States
St. Francis Schools (Alpharetta, Georgia)
St. Francis School (Goshen, Kentucky)
Saint Francis School (Hawaii)
Old St. Francis School, Bend, Oregon
St. Francis School (Austin, Texas)
St. Francis Indian School in St. Francis, South Dakota

See also
Saint Francis High School (disambiguation)